The 1991–92 1. Slovenská národná hokejová liga season was the 23rd season of the 1. Slovenská národná hokejová liga, the second level of ice hockey in Czechoslovakia alongside the 1. Česká národní hokejová liga. 12 teams participated in the league, and AC Nitra won the championship. Sparta ZVL Považská Bystrica was relegated.

Regular season

References

External links
 Season  on avlh.sweb.cz (PDF)

Czech
1st. Slovak National Hockey League seasons
2